The Men's 400m Freestyle event at the 2007 Pan American Games occurred at the Maria Lenk Aquatic Park in Rio de Janeiro, Brazil on 17 and 18 July. A total of 17 swimmers initially swam the race.

Medalists

Results

References
 Official Site

Freestyle, Men's 400m